Ulek Mayang is a classical Malay dance from the state of Terengganu in Malaysia. It is a ritualistic dance performed to appease or invoke the spirits of the sea and is always accompanied by a unique song also called Ulek Mayang. An orchestra comprising drums, gong, violin and accordion accompanies the dance.

History
The Ulek Mayang is said to have its origin in an ancient tale about a sea-princess who fell in love with a fisherman. The princess abducted the fisherman's soul, leaving his body unconscious. His friends entreated a bomoh (shaman) to heal him. When the bomoh conducted the healing ritual to bring the fisherman's soul back, the princess appeared and responded by calling on five of her sisters to her aid. The battle between the bomoh and the six princesses continued until 
seventh and the eldest princess appeared and put an end to it.

"I know your origins,” says the eldest princess, and she commands everyone, "Let those from the sea return to the sea, and those from the land return to the land."

The grateful bomoh and the fisherman's friends present the princess with coloured rice as an offering to the spirits of the sea. This practice, along with the Ulek Mayang dance, continued until the Islamization movement of recent decades.

Costume
The costume of Ulek Mayang dancers has two type of clothes, six of the seven female dancers will normally wear a traditional dress such as a long sleeve songket (a silk material blouse), selendang (a long scarf) that wore in the waist and finger, sanggol (a hairknot), subang (an earring) and long songket skirt in the lower body with others accessories. The main character of the dancer that played as a Tuan Puteri (Madam Princess) or Puteri Tujuh (7th Princess) will used the same dress and accessories like the six others dancers but the different thing is she will wear the short sleeve songket blouse and the color of her dress also are different. Usually she will wear the yellow dress. This is to illustrate that she is the main princess of the dancer. While the male dancers they will wear the traditional Malay male shirt like Baju Melayu (a Malay male shirt).

Lyrics
The Ulek Mayang song which accompanies the dance narrates the story. Tradition holds that the song is supernatural in nature because it gives chills, especially when performed at sunset by the beach. However, the song remains popular and there are numerous contemporary renditions of it. Malaysian rock diva, Ella recorded a rock version, while the thrash metal band Cromok produced several instrumental versions of the song. The song maintains some of the traditional Terengganu pronunciation. Note that mayang is a coconut-palm blossom used to chase away spirits.
<div class="noprint">
{| cellpadding=6
!Jawi script
!Rumi script
!Literal English translation
|- style="vertical-align:top; white-space:nowrap;"
|اولق مايڠ کو اولق
اولق دڠن جالا جيملا
اولق مايڠ داولق
اولق دڠن توانڽ ڤوتري
اولق مايڠ داولق
اولق دڠن جالا جيملا
اولق مايڠ داولق
اولق دڠن ڤوتريڽ دوا

ڤوتري دوا برباجو سيروڠ
ڤوتري دوا برسڠݢول سينديڠ
ڤوتري دوا برسوبڠ ݢاديڠ
ڤوتري دوا برسليندڠ کونيڠ
اومبوک مايڠ ديومبوک
اومبوک دڠن جالا جيملا
نوک اولق مايڠ داولق

ڤوتري امڤت برباجو سيروڠ
ڤوتري امڤت برسڠݢول سينديڠ
ڤوتري امڤت برسوبڠ ݢاديڠ
ڤوتري امڤت برسليندڠ کونيڠ
اومبوک مايڠ ديومبوک
اومبوک دڠن جالا جيملا
نوک اولق مايڠ داولق
اولق دڠن ڤوتريڽ انم

ڤوتري انم برباجو سيروڠ
ڤوتري انم برسڠݢول سينديڠ
ڤوتري انم برسوبڠ ݢاديڠ
ڤوتري انم برسليندڠ کونيڠ
اومبوک مايڠ ديومبوک
اومبوک دڠن جالا جيملا
نوک اولق مايڠ داولق
اولق دڠن ڤوتريڽ توجوه

ڤوتري توجوه برباجو سيروڠ
ڤوتري توجوه برسڠݢول سينديڠ
ڤوتري توجوه برسوبڠ ݢاديڠ
ڤوتري توجوه برسليندڠ کونيڠ
اومبوک مايڠ ديومبوک
اومبوک دڠن جالا جيملا
نوک اولق مايڠ داولق
اولق دڠن توانڽ ڤوتري

توان ڤوتري برباجو سيروڠ
توان ڤوتري برسڠݢول سينديڠ
توان ڤوتري برسوبڠ ݢاديڠ
توان ڤوتري برسليندڠ کونيڠ
اومبوک مايڠ ديومبوک
اومبوک دڠن جالا جيملا
نوک اولق مايڠ داولق
اولق دڠن توانڽ ڤوتري

کو تاهو اصل اصول مو
يڠ لاوت باليق ک لاوت
يڠ دارت باليق ک دارت
ناسي برورنا همبا سمبهکن
اومبوک مايڠ کو اومبوک
اومبوک دڠن جالا جيملا
ڤوليه مايڠ کو ڤوليه
ڤوليه باليق سديا کالا
|
Ulek mayang ku ulek 
Ulek dengan jala jemala 
Ulek mayang diulek 
Ulek dengan tuannya puteri 
Ulek mayang diulek 
Ulek dengan jala jemala 
Ulek mayang diulek 
Ulek dengan puterinya dua

Puteri dua berbaju serong 
Puteri dua bersanggol sendeng 
Puteri dua bersubang gading 
Puteri dua berselendang kuning 
Umbok mayang diumbok 
Umbok dengan jala jemala 
Nok ulek mayang diulek 
Ulek dengan puterinya empat

Puteri empat berbaju serong 
Puteri empat bersanggol sendeng 
Puteri empat bersubang gading 
Puteri empat berselendang kuning 
Umbok mayang diumbok 
Umbok dengan jala jemala 
Nok ulek mayang diulek 
Ulek dengan puterinya enam

Puteri enam berbaju serong 
Puteri enam bersanggol sendeng 
Puteri enam bersubang gading 
Puteri enam berselendang kuning 
Umbok mayang diumbok 
Umbok dengan jala jemala 
Nok ulek mayang diulek 
Ulek dengan puterinya tujuh

Puteri tujuh berbaju serong 
Puteri tujuh bersanggol sendeng 
Puteri tujuh bersubang gading 
Puteri tujuh berselendang kuning 
Umbok mayang diumbok 
Umbok dengan jala jemala 
Nok ulek mayang diulek 
Ulek dengan tuannya puteri

Tuan puteri berbaju serong 
Tuan puteri bersanggol sendeng 
Tuan puteri bersubang gading 
Tuan puteri berselendang kuning 
Umbok mayang diumbok 
Umbok dengan jala jemala 
Nok ulek mayang diulek 
Ulek dengan tuannya puteri

Ku tahu asal usul mu 
Yang laut balik ke laut 
Yang darat balik ke darat 
Nasi berwarna hamba sembahkan 
Umbok mayang ku umbok 
Umbok dengan jala jemala 
Pulih mayang ku pulih 
Pulih balik sedia kala 
|
I entreat the mayang
Entreat with shining nets
Entreat the mayang
Singing with her highness the princess
Entreat the mayang
Entreat it with shining nets
Entreat the mayang
Singing together with the second princess

Second princess wears a slanted blouse
Second princess with a slanted hair knot
Second princess wears ivory earrings
Second princess has a yellow scarf
Persuading the mayang
Persuade it with shining nets
Entreating the mayang
Singing with the fourth princess

Fourth princess wears a slanted blouse
Fourth princess with a slanted hairknot
Fourth princess wears ivory earrings
Fourth princess has a yellow scarf on
Persuading the mayang
Persuade it with shining nets
Entreating the mayang
Singing with the sixth princess

Sixth princess wears a slanted blouse
Sixth princess with a slanted hairknot
Sixth princess wears ivory earrings
Sixth princess has a yellow scarf 
Persuading the mayang
Persuade it with shining nets
Entreating the mayang
Singing with the seventh princess

Seventh princess wears a slanted blouse
Seventh princess with the slanted hairknot
Seventh princess wears ivory earrings
Seventh princess has a yellow scarf 
Persuading the mayang
Persuade it with shining nets
Entreating the mayang
Singing with her highness the princess

Her highness the princess wears a slanted blouse
Her highness the princess with a slanted hairknot
Her highness the princess wears ivory earrings
Her highness the princess has a yellow scarf 
Persuading the mayang
Persuade it with nets
Entreating the mayang
Singing with her highness the princess

I know your origins
Let those from the sea return to the sea
Let those from the land return to the land
I present the coloured rice
I persuade the mayang
Persuade it with shining nets
I heal with mayang
Bringing back to health
|}

External links
 Ulek Mayang (full song)
 Ella - Ulek Mayang
 D'Cromok - Metallurgical III
 D'Cromok - Another Metallurgical Suite
 Chakrasonic - Ulek Mayang (Tamil)

References

Malay dances
Malay culture
Malaysian culture
Dances of Malaysia